is a Japanese former football player.

Club statistics

References

External links

1988 births
Living people
Association football people from Mie Prefecture
Japanese footballers
J1 League players
J2 League players
Japan Football League players
Montedio Yamagata players
Veertien Mie players
Association football forwards